Tapit (foaled February 27, 2001, in Kentucky) is an American Thoroughbred racehorse who won three of his six races, including the Wood Memorial Stakes, then a Grade I event. He was an immediate success after retiring to stud, becoming the leading freshman sire in North America of 2008 with Breeders' Cup winner Stardom Bound becoming his first Grade I winner. He was the leading sire in North America in 2014, setting an earnings record that he broke in 2015 and again in 2016. For the 2015 season, his stud fee was raised to $300,000, the highest in North America. In 2021, Essential Quality became his fourth Belmont Stakes winner (Tonalist, Creator and Tapwrit being the others), tying him for the all-time record of winners sired in this race with the great Lexington.

Background
Tapit is a gray horse. He is heterozygous for the dominant gray gene, which he inherited via his dam, Tap Your Heels. As such, there is a 50-50 chance that any given foal sired by him on a non-gray mare will be gray.  His base coat color before turning gray was chestnut.

Tapit was purchased as a yearling in 2002 for $625,000 by Verne Winchell, a prominent California owner, under the recommendation of his bloodstock advisor  Dr. David Lambert. Winchell died soon afterwards and left the horse to his son, Ron. The manager of Winchell Thoroughbreds, David Fiske, placed the horse in the hands of trainer Michael Dickinson.

Tapit has been described as an attractive, well-balanced, elegant horse whose appearance reflects the Thoroughbred’s Arabian ancestors.

Racing career
Tapit raced twice at age two, winning both times. On October 19, he won a one-mile maiden special weight at Delaware Park by 7 3/4 lengths. He then won the Grade III Laurel Futurity Stakes on November 15 by five lengths, earning a Beyer Speed Figure of 98. Veteran sportswriter Andrew Beyer wrote, "No 2-year-old in America had looked more impressive."

His return to the racetrack was delayed due to lingering shin problems. He made his 3-year-old debut in the Florida Derby on March 13 and finished sixth in the Grade 1 race, but his poor finish was later explained by the discovery of a lung infection. He bounced back in April, coming from last to win the Grade I Wood Memorial Stakes by half a length over Master David. “I was dreading the race, because I knew he wasn’t fit,” trainer Michael Dickinson said. “He’s a very generous horse, and he has such a big heart. I felt I was putting him into battle unprepared. And if anything had happened I would have blamed myself. But the horse carried me through, and I’m indebted to him. He’s such a generous horse and we love him dearly.”

Tapit was the 6–1 third betting choice in the 2004 Kentucky Derby and finished ninth behind Smarty Jones. He was scheduled to race in the 2004 Belmont Stakes but was scratched due to a return of the lung infection. In his last race, the Sept. 6, 2004, Pennsylvania Derby, he finished ninth.

Stud career
Tapit was retired to stud at Gainesway Farm in Lexington, Kentucky in 2005 for a stud fee of $15,000. His first foals were of racing age in 2008 and he made an immediate impact, making him the leading freshman sire that year. His first crop was led by champion 2-year-old filly Stardom Bound, winner of the 2008 Breeders' Cup Juvenile Fillies, and included 15 stakes winners overall.

His next few crops were not as strong but he was still third on the 2009 second-crop sire list (including 2009 Breeders' Cup Juvenile Fillies Turf winner Tapitsfly), and third on the 2010 third-crop sire list. In 2011, he was third on the general sire list. His leading performer, Hansen, won the Breeders' Cup Juvenile and was named champion two-year-old. Tapit finished fourth on the general sire list in 2012, and seventh in 2013.

In 2014 Tapit led the sire list for North America, setting an earnings record in the process. His top performers of 2014 were Untapable and Tonalist. Tonalist became Tapit's first American Classic winner when he won the 2014 Belmont Stakes; Untapable won the Kentucky Oaks and Breeders' Cup Distaff, and was named champion 3-year-old filly.

In 2015, Tapit led the sire list for the second time, breaking his own earnings record. Top performers that year included Tonalist and Frosted. In 2015, he also led North America by number of winners with 174. He was the leading sire in every "black-type" category tracked by Thoroughbred Daily News, with 23 Black-Type Winners, 47 Black-Type Horses (meaning that 47 of his foals finished first, second or third in qualifying stakes company), 16 Graded/Group Stakes Winners, 29 Graded Stakes Horses, five Grade I/Group 1 winners and 10 Grade/Group 1-placed horses.

In 2016, he once again headed the sire list, with top performers including Frosted and 2016 Belmont Stakes winner Creator. Two fillies sired by him dead-heated in the Grade I Spinaway Stakes, the two being Pretty City Dancer and Sweet Loretta. He also sired two Grade I winners on the turf, Ring Weekend and Time and Motion. David Firsk, the stallion manager of Winchell Stable, said, "The versatility he has and everything else, I mean, you could subtract his turf earnings from his total ... and he'd still be the leading sire. Turf runners are like a hobby for him."

In 2017, his son Tapwrit won the Belmont Stakes, marking the third time a son of Tapit had won the race in four years. His other leading performers included Cupid (Gold Cup at Santa Anita), Actress (Black-Eyed Susan), and Unique Bella (American Champion Female Sprint Horse, Las Virgenes, Santa Ysabel Stakes, La Brea Stakes).

With his record of siring winners, his stud fee steadily increased, from the original $15,000 to $80,000 in 2011, $125,000 in 2013, and to $150,000 in 2014. For the 2015 breeding season, his fee was doubled to $300,000, and in 2017 was the highest in the United States. In 2014, a single share in Tapit, providing a guaranteed breeding right for the rest of his career, was sold for $2.8 million. This made his total value an estimated $140 million.

Tapit has produced the most successful foals from mares that "nick" or complement the genetic strengths in his pedigree. Tapit is inbred to Nijinsky, a son of Northern Dancer, and many of his best offspring are out of mares who also carry Northern Dancer breeding, but via different lines. Frosted is an example of how Tapit crosses well on mares that carry the bloodlines of Seattle Slew.

Statistics

† Prior to 2015, the Leading Sire Lists published by The Blood-Horse excluded earnings from Hong Kong and Japan due to the disparity in purses. Starting in 2015, earnings from Hong Kong and Japan are included on an adjusted basis.

Notable progeny
His major stakes winners include:

c = colt, f = filly, g = gelding

Pedigree
Tapit is by Pulpit, who stood at Claiborne Farm. Pulpit is by A.P. Indy, the 1992 Horse of the Year and an outstanding sire. A.P. Indy is by Triple Crown winner Seattle Slew, and out of Weekend Surprise by Secretariat. Pulpit's female family traces back to one of Claiborne's foundation mares, Knight's Daughter, the dam of Round Table.

Tapit's dam is Tap Your Heels, a stakes-winning mare by Unbridled. Her dam, Ruby Slippers, also produced champion sprinter Rubiano, and is the third dam of champion Summer Bird. Tapit's third dam, Moon Glitter, was a stakes-winning full sister to important sire Relaunch. Tap Your Heels is inbred to In Reality, a descendant of Man o' War.

Tapit is inbred 3s × 4d to Mr Prospector, meaning he appears in the 3rd generation on the sire side and 4th generation on the dam side of his pedigree.

He has seven strains tracing to the influential broodmare La Troienne.

References

External links
 Tapit's World - BloodHorse feature
 TT Tapit
Gainesway Farms web site

2001 racehorse births
Racehorses bred in Kentucky
Racehorses trained in the United States
Thoroughbred family 3-o
United States Champion Thoroughbred Sires